Ik Madari is  a 1973  Pakistani Punjabi language Family drama movie.

Directed by Chodhary Sagheer Ahmad and produced by Malik Mohammad Rafiq. Film starring actor Allauddin in the lead role and with Naghma, Habib, and then as the villain Sultan Rahi

Cast
 Naghma as 'Jamil's' love interest
 Habib as 'Jamil'
 Allauddin as Madari (as a juggler)
 Seema
 Mazhar Shah
 Ali Ejaz
 Nazar
 Afzal Khan
 Zumurrud
 Nasira
 Meena Chodhary
 Imdad Hussain
 Albela
 Rangeela 
 Sultan Rahi
 Beena Banerjee
 Sabar Shah
 Phattu 
 Nazar
 Babar Malik

Soundtrack

Track listing
The music of the film 'Ik Madari' is by Pakistani musician Tafoo

References

Pakistani drama films
Punjabi-language Pakistani films
1973 films
1973 drama films
1970s Punjabi-language films
1973 directorial debut films